Nuutti Lintamo (23 December 1909 – 25 June 1973) was a Finnish footballer. He played in 23 matches for the Finland national football team from 1930 to 1939. He was also part of Finland's team for their qualification matches for the 1938 FIFA World Cup.

He was a one-club men and played his whole club career for Vaasan Palloseura During his 13 seasons he played 10 seasons in Mestaruussarja earning 107 caps and 82 goals for his club. In addition he played 2 seasons in second tier where he scored 19 goals and one season in cup formatted championship where he scored twice.

Honours

Individual 
 Mestaruussarja Top Scorer: 1935

References

External links
 

1909 births
1973 deaths
Finnish footballers
Finland international footballers
Place of birth missing
Association footballers not categorized by position